Red Hill, also known as Pak Pat Shan, is a  hill located in Tai Tam, Southern District, Hong Kong.

Residential area 
Currently, this area primarily consists of low-rise upmarket residences, including the Redhill Peninsula, Red Hill Park, Turtle Cove, Le Palais and Villa Rosa. The summit is now occupied by a private estate and not accessible to the public.

See also 
 List of mountains, peaks and hills in Hong Kong

References 

Southern District, Hong Kong